"Patterns" is the eighth single by British rock band, Small Faces, first released on Decca Records in 1967. It was the first of two unauthorised singles released in the United Kingdom (the second being Afterglow (of Your Love) in 1969). It was written by the Small Faces primary songwriters Steve Marriott and Ronnie Lane. It became one of few singles by the group that features Lane on primary vocals, in contrast to Marriott's standard role as the group's lead vocalist.

Song profile 
The song was released a while after Small Faces switched record labels and management from Decca Records to Immediate Records. Don Arden, who wanted to capitalise on the Small Faces success during his management, issued several songs from the Decca archives onto the market. The majority of these tracks appeared on From the Beginning, a compilation album released on 2 June 1967, while "Patterns" was chosen as the lead single. As the tensions between Decca and Small Faces were high, the band refused to promote the song, which failed to chart on the UK Singles Chart, the second to do so after "I've Got Mine" in 1965. Ultimately it became their last single released by Decca Records.

The single was not released on an album upon release, and got its first release in 1976 on the compilation album Rock Roots, released by Decca. It has since been released on several re-issues of Small Faces, most notably it was included on the 2012 deluxe edition of the album, where it received a duophonic mix for the first time.

Original issues of the single release are now considered rare collectibles and can sell for hundreds of pounds on the market. The B-side "E Too D", a hard rock-influenced song, was previously issued as the penultimate track on their debut album in May 1966.

Personnel 

 Steve Marriott – lead and rhythm guitar, shared lead vocals
 Ronnie Lane –  bass guitar, shared lead vocals
 Ian McLagan –  hammond organ, backing vocals
 Kenney Jones –  drums

References 

Songs written by Steve Marriott
Songs written by Ronnie Lane
1967 singles